NCT may stand for:

Tests
 National Car Test, Ireland, a roadworthiness test for cars
 National Curriculum Tests, in the English education system

Organizations and companies
 Nashville Children's Theatre, the oldest professional children's theatre company in the United States
 National Comedy Theatre, an improvisational theatrical company in the United States
 Niagara College Teaching Winery, a college in Ontario, Canada, which produces wine sold locally
 Nobel Charitable Trust, a charity set up by members of the Swedish Nobel family
 National Childbirth Trust, a UK-based charity related to pregnancy, childbirth and early parenthood
 Nottingham City Transport, a bus operator in Nottingham, England
 North Carolina Theatre, a semi-professional theatre company in North Carolina
 North County Times, a newspaper in northern San Diego County, California
 Newark Castle railway station, in Newark-on-Trent, United Kingdom
 The ICAO airline code for NokScoot, a defunct airline in Bangkok, Thailand
 Northern California TRACON, an air traffic control facility in Mather, California

Locations
 National Capital Territory of Delhi, the official name of the city and the union territory of Delhi, India
 North Country Trail, a United States National Scenic Trail running from New York to North Dakota

Science
 Nuclear Compton Telescope, a balloon-borne gamma-ray detector
 Nicastrin, a protein component of the gamma secretase enzyme complex
 Nocturnal clitoral tumescence, a spontaneous swelling of the clitoris during sleep or when waking up
 Neutron Capture Therapy, a type of cancer treatment
 Nitrocellulose tubular, a type of smokeless powder
 Non-Contact Tonometry, a medical test that estimates fluid pressure inside the eye

Religion
New Covenant theology, a form of Christian theology

Economics
 Niue Consumption Tax, a tax in the South Pacific island nation Niue

Music
 NCT (group), or Neo Culture Technology, a South Korean boy band
NCT U, the first sub-unit of NCT
NCT 127, the second sub-unit of NCT
NCT Dream, the third sub-unit of NCT
WayV, a Chinese boy group which serves as the Chinese sub-unit and the fourth sub-unit of NCT

 Nonchord tone, or non-harmonic tone, tones not analyzed as part of the chord